Brigitte Lastrade (born 31 May 1972) is a Canadian judoka. She competed in the women's extra-lightweight event at the 1992 Summer Olympics.

References

External links
 

1972 births
Living people
Canadian female judoka
Olympic judoka of Canada
Judoka at the 1992 Summer Olympics
Sportspeople from Montreal
Pan American Games medalists in judo
Pan American Games bronze medalists for Canada
Judoka at the 1991 Pan American Games
Judoka at the 1999 Pan American Games
Medalists at the 1991 Pan American Games
Medalists at the 1999 Pan American Games
20th-century Canadian women
21st-century Canadian women